Napi Rock is located in the Lewis Range, Glacier National Park in the U.S. state of Montana. Napi Rock is a pinnacle on the eastern end of Singleshot Mountain and is easily seen from Saint Mary, Montana. Napi Rock is named for Napioa also known as Nah-pee, a fictional creation myth figure of the Blookfoot who was believed to have created the earth and everything on it.

See also
 Mountains and mountain ranges of Glacier National Park (U.S.)

References

Mountains of Glacier County, Montana
Mountains of Glacier National Park (U.S.)
Lewis Range